Anou Dam  is a gravity dam located in Mie Prefecture in Japan. The dam is used for irrigation. The catchment area of the dam is 27.5 km2. The dam impounds about 49  ha of land when full and can store 10500 thousand cubic meters of water. The construction of the dam was started on 1972 and completed in 1989.

See also
List of dams in Japan

References

Dams in Mie Prefecture